Besse-et-Saint-Anastaise, also known as Besse-en-Chandesse (its official name from April 2, 1961, to July 1, 1973), or Besse (its name before 1961), is a commune in the Puy-de-Dôme department in Auvergne-Rhône-Alpes in central France.

The nearby ski resort of Super-Besse is to host the first mountain finish of the 2008 Tour de France.

Geography
The river Rhue has its source in the commune.

Population

See also
 Arthur Besse
 Nicolas Bourbaki
 Communes of the Puy-de-Dôme department

References

Communes of Puy-de-Dôme